Nicholas Barrett (born ) is a New Zealand rugby union footballer. He plays as a prop for the Crusaders in Super Rugby and Southland Stags in the ITM Cup.

References

External links 
itsrugby.co.uk profile

1988 births
Living people
Auckland rugby union players
Chiefs (rugby union) players
Crusaders (rugby union) players
Māori All Blacks players
New Zealand Māori rugby union players
New Zealand rugby union players
Rugby union players from Dannevirke
Rugby union props
Southland rugby union players